Slobodan Jovanović (3 December 1869 – 12 December 1958) was a Serbian and Yugoslav writer, historian, lawyer, philosopher, literary critic, diplomat, politician and one of the most prominent intellectuals of his time. He was the professor at the University of Belgrade Faculty of Law (1897—1940), Rector of the University of Belgrade (1913–14 and 1920–21), and the President of the Serbian Royal Academy (1928–1931). He took part at the Paris Peace Conference (1919) as an expert for the Yugoslav Government.

Jovanović was the Deputy Prime Minister (March 1941 - June 1942) and the Prime Minister of the Royal Yugoslav government-in-exile in London between January 1942 and June 1943. After World War II, the new Communist authorities of Yugoslavia sentenced him in absentia to 20 years' imprisonment. Jovanović remained at liberty for the rest of his life in London.

Biography

Slobodan Jovanović was born in Újvidék, Austria-Hungary (present-day Novi Sad, Serbia) on 3 December 1869 to politician Vladimir Jovanović and his wife Jelena. He was reportedly the first Serbian male to be named "Slobodan" (sloboda means "freedom" in Serbian), while his sister was named Pravda ("Justice"). He received an excellent education in Belgrade, Munich, Zurich, and Geneva, where he graduated with a law degree. From 1890 to 1892, he took post-graduate studies in constitutional law and political science in Paris before entering the Serbian foreign service. In 1893 he was appointed political attaché with the Serbian mission to Constantinople, where he remained for a couple years. It was at this time that he began to write and have his articles on literary criticism published in various publications throughout the land.

He eventually left the diplomatic service in favour of academia and literary pursuits and became a contributing author and literary critic for several notable newspapers of the time. In 1897 he was appointed professor at the University of Belgrade's Faculty of Law. During the Balkan Wars and the First World War he was the Head of Serbian War Office Press Bureau. In this period Jovanović became acquainted with Dragutin Dimitrijević Apis and wrote positively of him. Shortly after the foundation of the Kingdom of Serbs, Croats, and Slovenes, in 1920, Stojan Protić, acting as Prime Minister of the Temporary National Representation, appointed Jovanović as the President of a multi-ethnic constitutional drafting committee alongside Kosta Kumanudi, Bogumil Vošnjak, Ladislav Polić, and Lazar Marković which later that year presented the first draft of what would later become the Vidovdan Constitution.

For more than four decades, Jovanović taught at the law faculty gaining a reputation as an authority on constitutional law and Serbian language and literature. He was Rector of the University of Belgrade on two separate occasions and Dean of Faculty of Law. Jovanović joined the Serbian Royal Academy in 1908, and was its President from 1928 to 1931. He was also a correspondent member of the Yugoslav Academy of Sciences and Arts in Zagreb from 1927.

Slobodan Jovanović was a critic of Hans Kelsen's Pure Theory of Law. His primary remarks are on the relation of Kelsen's theory to other German theorists at the time. He considered Kelsen an innovative "young" theorist, but thought that his framework was not as dissimilar to more classical theories that Kelsen, in Jovanović's opinion, tried to attack. Namely, Jovanović posited that the special position of the Basic norm for Kelsen could be reduced to the framework of more classical German theories, in which the state is a legal person from which the legal system originates, and vice versa. Jovanović considered this to be a flaw of Kelsen's Legal positivism that makes it a theory that does not truly address the origins of the law, as it fails to truly separate in analysis the legal system from the state as an actor. In this way, Jovanović rejects an analysis that would fully divorce the man as a legal creature, from man as a political one.

Jovanović had some influence on political life in the Kingdom of Yugoslavia due to his well established authority in the field of law and history, but he entered directly political life only in 1939 when the Serbian Cultural Club was established, and he was appointed as Club's president.

He was a pro-Western politician and when a pro-Western military coup took place in Belgrade on 27 March 1941, a pro-Western, essentially pro-British government was installed headed by General Dušan Simović. Jovanović was deputy Prime Minister in that government. The Third Reich attacked the Kingdoms of Yugoslavia and Greece on 6 April, and soon defeated Yugoslav and Greek forces. Jovanović moved in mid April together with King Peter II and other cabinet ministers to Jerusalem and he reached London in July. He became prime minister of the Yugoslav government-in-exile during World War II on 11 January 1942 and remained in that position until 26 June 1943.

Tried in absence in Josip Broz Tito's communist state together with general Draža Mihailović, he was sentenced to 20 years in jail which he never served, as well as the loss of political and civil rights for a period of ten years, and confiscation of all property and loss of citizenship. He spent his later years in exile in London (1945–1958). A memorial plaque in honour of Professor Slobodan Yovanovitch, Serbian historian, literary critic, legal scholar, Prime Minister of Yugoslavia may be found in London at 39b Queen's Gate Gardens, Kensington.

After unofficial rehabilitation in 1989, his collected works were published in 1991.

Legacy

Jovanović was decorated Order of Osmanieh and Order of Saint Sava.

In Serbia, he is regarded as one of the most influential liberals and political thinkers of the turn of the century. A number of his writings on a number of ideas such as Machiavellism and Platonist ideas of state are still relevant today.

Leading Serbian journal Politika on the occasion of his 70th birthday concluded that "his name has been carved as the highest peak of our culture up to now".

Works
His collected works were published in 17 volumes in 1939–1940. They contain the results of his unremitting labour as a writer, professor and politician for sixty years, and throw considerable light on Balkan history of the first half of the 20th century, as well as on the author himself. Although his works were not officially banned, any new issue of his books was not permitted in communist Yugoslavia until the late 1980s. Finally, a new edition of his collected works was published in Belgrade in 12 volumes in 1991.

Since 2003 his portrait has appeared on the 5000 dinar banknote, and his bust stands at the Faculty of Law in Belgrade. His official rehabilitation occurred on 26 October 2007 by a Belgrade court. Since 10 December 2011, plateau in front of Faculty of Law in Belgrade bears his name.

 [On Sovereignty, Belgrade, 1897].
 [On Bicameral System, Belgrade, 1899].
 [Great People's Assembly, Belgrade, 1900].
 [Serbo-Bulgarian War. A paper in diplomatic history], Belgrade 1901].
 [Svetozar Markovic, Belgrade 1903].
 [An Introduction to the Legal Theory on State, Belgrade, 1906].
 [An Introduction to the Public Law of the Kingdom of Serbia, Belgrade, 1907–1909, in two volumes].
 Makiaveli, Beograd 1907.
  [Political and Legal Considerations, Belgrade, 1908–1910, in two volumes].
  [Constitutionalists and their Government (Belgrade: Serbian Royal Academy, 1912).
  [University Question, Belgrade, 1914].
  [Leaders of the French Revolution, Belgrade, 1920].
  [On State, Belgrade, 1922], his capital work
  [The Second Rule of Milosh and Michael, Belgrade, 1923].
  [Constitutional Law of the Kingdom of Serbs, Croats and Slovenes, Belgrade, 1924].
  [The Rule of Milan Obrenovich (Belgrade: Geca Kon, 1926–1927), in two volumes].
 . [The Rule of Alexander Obrenovich (Belgrade: Geca Kon, 1929–1931, in two volumes].
  [From the History of Political Doctrines, Belgrade, 1935].
  [Slobodan Jovanovic, Gladstone (Belgrade: Jugo-istok, 1938)].
  [American Federalism, Belgrade, 1939].
  [Examples of Political Sociology: England, France and Germany, 1815–1914, Belgrade, 1940].
  [On Totalitarianism (Paris: Oslobodjenje, 1952].
  [A Contribution to the Study of the Serbian National Character, Windsor /Canada/, 1964].
  [Notes on Problems and Individuals, 1941–1944, London, 1976)]
 Slobodan Jovanovich, Tito and the Western World (reprinted from The Eastern Quarterly), London, 1952, pg. 6.
 Slobodan Jovanovich, On the New Machiavellism (reprinted from The Eastern Quarterly), London, 1952, pg. 5.

References
 Jovan Skerlić: Istorija nove srpske književnosti (Belgrade, 1914), page 382

Sources
 
 
 
 
 
 Britannica'
 Dimitrije Djordjevic (1973). «Historians in Politics: Slobodan Jovanovic». Journal of Contemporary History 8 (1):  pp. 21–40.

Further reading

External links

 Slobodan Jovanović Fund

1869 births
1958 deaths
Writers from Novi Sad
20th-century Serbian historians
Politicians from Novi Sad
Members of the Serbian Academy of Sciences and Arts
World War II political leaders
Academic staff of the University of Belgrade
Rectors of the University of Belgrade
Serbian legal scholars
Eastern Orthodox Christians from Serbia
Prime Ministers of Yugoslavia
Serbian exiles
People convicted in absentia